Mattia Gallon (born May 30, 1992) is an Italian professional footballer who plays for Lucchese as a forward.

Club career
He made his Serie A debut for Cagliari on 28 March 2010 in a game against Sampdoria.

On 17 August 2019, he joined Serie D club Licata. He left the club in December 2019, to join another Serie D club, Lucchese.

References

External links
 

1992 births
People from the Province of Oristano
Footballers from Sardinia
Living people
Italian footballers
Italy youth international footballers
Association football forwards
Cagliari Calcio players
Treviso F.B.C. 1993 players
Savona F.B.C. players
Olbia Calcio 1905 players
Nuorese Calcio players
S.S.D. Marsala Calcio players
Serie A players
Serie D players
U.S. Castrovillari Calcio players